Metlox Pottery, strictly speaking Metlox Manufacturing Company, was a manufacturer of ceramic housewares, located at 1200 Morningside Drive, Manhattan Beach, California, US. The pottery factory closed in 1989.

History 

Metlox Pottery was founded in 1927 by Theodor C. Prouty and his son Willis Prouty, originally as a producer of outdoor ceramic signs.  After the death of T.C. in 1931, Willis renamed the company Metlox Pottery ("Metlox" is a combination of "metal" and "oxide," a reference to the glaze pigments), and began producing dinnerware.  The Metlox Manufacturing Company was incorporated 5 October 1933. Evan K. Shaw, of American Pottery in Los Angeles, purchased Metlox from Willis Prouty in 1946. After Shaw's death in 1980, Kenneth Avery became the president of Metlox.
The first line of pottery produced, "Poppytrail," became well known for its brightly colored glazes derived from locally mined metallic oxides.  Subsequent lines included "Nostalgia," "Red Rooster," "California Provincial," "Colonial Homestead," "Homestead Provincial," and "Colorstax."

In the 1950s Metlox introduced a line of modernist dinnerware featuring free form designs and squared plates using "blanks" that were then decorated with designs and colors.  These were then marketed under the pattern names of "California Contempra", "California Modern" and "California Freeform" names.

Besides kitchenware, Metlox also produced a very popular line of large ceramic horses and carriages in the 1950s. Carl Romanelli designed vases, figurines and miniatures for Metlox.  A line of collectible ceramic people planters called "Poppets," designed by studio potter Helen Slater, were produced starting in 1970. 

In March 1971, the FDA announced a recall of 400,000 pieces of Metlox pottery due to high lead content in the pottery glaze. One individual was suspected to have been poisoned. The company voluntarily recalled their California Poppytrail Tempo and Mission Verde Series; with a portion of their Petalburst Metlox Vernonware Series. The remainder of Metlox's pottery did not present lead leaching. 

Metlox's incorporation was terminated on 4 January 1988. 
The pottery factory closed in 1989 after 62 years of operation. Metlox's  former site is now occupied by Shade Hotel and other businesses.

After the pottery closed, lead and other byproducts of the pottery-making process remained on the plant property at Manhattan Beach Boulevard and Valley Drive. The city estimated remediation would take about 2 years with the cost to be collected from the property owners or having the site put on a State or Federal cleanup list.

See also 

 California pottery

References

Further reading 

Gibbs, Carl. Collector's Encyclopedia of Metlox Potteries: Identification and Values, Second Edition. Collector Books (2001)  
Chipman, Jack. Collectors Encyclopedia of California Pottery, Second Edition.  Collector Books (1998)

External links
Metlox-Poppytrail-Vernonware History

Kitchenware brands
Companies based in California
Ceramics manufacturers of the United States
Manhattan Beach, California
Defunct companies based in Greater Los Angeles